The Old Ministry of Labour Building (Chinese: 前劳工部大厦) is a former building of the Ministry of Labour located at Havelock Square in the Outram Planning Area, within the Central Area of Singapore's central business district. The building once housed the former Chinese Protectorate which was first established in 1877 to protect and control Chinese immigrants to Singapore. The building had since been restored in 1990 and currently used as the Family and Juvenile Court of Singapore.

History
After Singapore was established as a Straits Settlement trading port in 1819, the arrival of the Chinese immigrants, whom mostly constituted of the villagers from southern China increased steadily. Most were men who had come to look for work as indentured labourers or coolies. They were often abused by their agents, who held them indebted for their passage here or for fees of one kind or another. Many of the Chinese women who came ended up in brothels. Laws concerning the welfare of Chinese immigrants were drafted in 1867, though they were weakly implemented.

In 1877, the Chinese Protectorate was launched as an intermediary between the colonial government and the Chinese community to try to stem the abuse of Chinese immigrants. William A. Pickering, who was familiar with Chinese culture and understood the problems of the Chinese community, was called to be in charge. The role of Chinese Protectorate was to look after the welfare of the Chinese community, its work involved fighting the exploitation of prostitutes and coolies by their agents, the regulation of Chinese societies, and the control of triads. The first Chinese Protectorate was in a shophouse on Canal Road.

As the protectorate’s responsibilities and staff strength grew, its office was first relocated to the Upper Macao Street (present day Pickering Street), followed by a new shophouse at Boat Quay, and finally to a newly constructed two storey building at the corner of New Bridge Road and Havelock Road in 1886.

Under Pickering, the Chinese Protectorate did much to improve the welfare of the Chinese community, which made Pickering a popular figure among the Chinese community. However, due to a near-fatal attack by a secret society member, he retired in 1888.

The former Chinese Protectorate Building was later demolished and new Neo-Classical building was built in 1928 on its former site, with the Chinese Protectorate moved in 1930. The Chinese Protectorate functioned at the building until the outbreak of World War II. After the war, its responsibilities were taken over by the Ministry of Labour and Social Welfare from 1956 and later, the Ministry of Labour and renamed as Ministry of Labour Building. The former Ministry of Labour Building was later taken over by the Singapore Ministry of Law and had been refurbished as the Family and Juvenile Court Building in 1990.

National Monument
The Old Ministry of Labour Building was gazetted as a national monument on 27 February 1998.

References

National Heritage Board (2002), Singapore's 100 Historic Places, Archipelago Press, 
Preservation of Monuments Board, Know Our Monuments

External links

Subordinate Courts of Singapore

Government buildings completed in 1928
Landmarks in Singapore
National monuments of Singapore
Outram, Singapore
1928 establishments in Singapore
20th-century architecture in Singapore